The 2018 Gazprom Hungarian Open was a men's tennis tournament played on outdoor clay courts. It was the 2nd edition of the Hungarian Open, and part of the ATP World Tour 250 series of the 2018 ATP World Tour. It took place at Nemzeti Edzés Központ in Budapest, Hungary, from April 23–29.

Singles main-draw entrants

Seeds

1 Rankings are as of April 16, 2018

Other entrants
The following players received wildcards into the singles main draw:
  Attila Balázs
  Alexander Bublik
  Zsombor Piros

The following players received entry from the qualifying draw:
  Matteo Berrettini 
  Hubert Hurkacz 
  Lorenzo Sonego 
  Jürgen Zopp

The following players received entry as lucky losers:
  Marco Cecchinato
  Yannick Maden

Withdrawals
Before the tournament
  Laslo Đere → replaced by  Marco Cecchinato
  Alexandr Dolgopolov → replaced by  Denis Istomin
  Filip Krajinović → replaced by  John Millman
  Florian Mayer → replaced by  Yannick Maden
  Jiří Veselý → replaced by  Mikhail Youzhny

Doubles main-draw entrants

Seeds

1 Rankings are as of April 16, 2018

Other entrants
The following pairs received wildcards into the doubles main draw:
  Attila Balázs /  Márton Fucsovics
  Marius Copil /  Florin Mergea

Champions

Singles 

  Marco Cecchinato def.  John Millman, 7–5, 6–4

Doubles 

  Dominic Inglot /  Franko Škugor def.  Matwé Middelkoop /  Andrés Molteni, 6–7(8–10), 6–1, [10–8]

References

External links 
Official website

2018
2018 ATP World Tour
2018 in Hungarian tennis
Hungarian Open